Marchienne-au-Pont is a town of Wallonia and a district of the municipality of Charleroi, located in the province of Hainaut, Belgium.  

It was a commune in its own right before the merger of communes in 1977, when it had a population of 17,000.

Sights
 The Castle of Cartier was built on the ruins of an earlier castle, which had been destroyed by the troops of Henri II on July 21, 1554. The Cartier family owned it from 1726 to 1938. It was converted to a library in April 2002. The outer bailey has been replaced by a public swimming pool and the park has been partly destroyed.
 The city walls.

History 

To outline the history of the locality of Marchienne-au-Pont, we must go back to the 9th century, to the death of Charlemagne. His Empire is divided into three parts: Francia, Germania, and between the two, a long territory called the Kingdom of Lothair. This turned out to be a large part of present-day Belgium and Burgundy. On November 15, 889, Arnold of Carinthia, King of Germany, in order to secure political support in Lotharingia, gave the Abbey of Lobbes and its 17 villages to Francon, Abbot of Lobbes and then Bishop of Liège. 

In 980, Prince-Bishop Notger acquired the powers of the count and transformed the domain into a political enclave of Liège with, as a stronghold, Thuin and its ramparts. Under the protection of the prince-bishops Marchienne develops and prospers.

Yvonne Viesley 
On October12, 1918, Yvonne Viesley, age 10, was shot by a German soldier after she tried to pass a piece of bread to French prisoners through the bars of a gate. French president Poincaré gave her a posthumous medal of honor on September11, 1919.  A monument has been built where she fell.

Coat of arms

People born in Marchienne-au-Pont
 Fernand Verhaegen, painter and etcher
 André Souris, classical music composer associated with the Surrealists

Gallery

See also
Écho de la Sambre - A newspaper that was published in Marchienne-au-Pont.

References

External links

 Picture of the castle court
 Photo gallery of the monument dedicated to Yvonne Viesley

Sub-municipalities of Charleroi
Former municipalities of Hainaut (province)